Jody Davis is the name of:

 Jody Davis (baseball) (born 1956), former baseball player for the Chicago Cubs (1981–1988) and Atlanta Braves (1989–1990), later a manager
 Jody Davis (musician), guitarist for the Christian pop rock band The Newsboys

See also
Jodie Davis, cricketer